ZH Mintu is a Bangladeshi Cinematographer. He won the Bangladesh National Film Award for Best Cinematography for the film Postmaster 71 (2018).

Filmography
 Kartooz - 2015
 Brihonnola - 2014 
 Nijhum Oronney - 2010 
 Golapi Ekhon Bilatey - 2010 
 Ebadat - 2009 
 Kopal - 2007 
 Ayna - 2006 
 Kal Shokale - 2005 
 Kheya Ghater Majhi - 2003 
 Shundori Bodhu
 Uttarer Khep
 Sotter Shongram
 Hangor Nodi Grenade - 1997
 Shilpi - 1995
 Adorer Sontan - 1995 
 Golapi Ekhon Dhakai - 1994 
 Padma Meghna Jamuna - 1991 
 Ghar Amar Ghar - 1990
 Biroho Byatha - 1989
 Durnam - 1989
 Shuvoda - 1986

Awards and nominations
National Film Awards

References

External links
 

Living people
Bangladeshi cinematographers
Best Cinematographer National Film Award (Bangladesh) winners
Year of birth missing (living people)